Sir Henry Edward Fox Young, KCMG (23 April 1803 – 18 September 1870) was the fifth Governor of South Australia, serving in that role from 2 August 1848 until 20 December 1854.  He was then the first Governor of Tasmania, from 1855 until 1861.

Early life
Young was the third son of Sir Aretas William Young, a well-known peninsular officer, and was born at Brabourne, Kent. He was educated at Dean's School, Bromley, Middlesex, and, intended for the bar, entered as a student at the Inner Temple.

Early career
Young was appointed in 1827 to a position in the colonial treasury in Trinidad, and in 1828 was transferred to Demerara, British Guiana. From 1833, he was involved in the emancipation of slaves in the British Caribbean colonies. In 1834, he was posted briefly to St Lucia as treasurer, secretary and member of the council, and in 1835 returned to British Guiana as government secretary.

In 1847, Young returned to London, before he was appointed lieutenant-governor of the Eastern District of the Cape Colony (later the Eastern Cape) in South Africa. He was knighted in 1847.

Governor of South Australia
Young was transferred a few months later to South Australia where he arrived on 1 August 1848 on the Forfarshire. It was hoped that he would be able to announce some measure of responsible government but he had nothing to say on this subject, and it was not until February 1851 that an ordinance was passed constituting a Legislative council of 24 members, of whom eight were nominated by the crown (four officials and four appointed by the governor) and 16 were to be elected. Under Young, South Australia received its first formal parliament.

The South Australian House of Assembly comprised 36 members each elected from a different area. It was Governor Young who offered a prize of £2000 in 1851 for the first person to travel up the Murray River to its junction with the Darling River (now the town of Wentworth) in a paddle steamer. The prize was claimed in 1853 by Francis Cadell with his steamer Lady Augusta (named for Sir Henry's wife). Due to the difficulty of navigating the Murray Mouth, Young supported building the railway from the river port of Goolwa to the new sea port at Port Elliot (named after his friend, Charles Elliot). 
Young was a supporter of St Peter's College and the Young Prize, awarded annually from income from a section of land at Dry Creek, and vested in the college for the purpose, was named for him.
He was president of the Adelaide Philosophical Society 1853–1854.
Though it was expected sooner or later, the order for his transfer to Van Diemen's Land (today's Tasmania) gave little time for the usual formalities and farewells.

Governor of Van Diemens Land/Tasmania
Young began his duties in Van Diemens Land in January 1855. Sir Henry Fox Young's term as Governor of Van Diemens Land was significant, because in 1856 the Island colony received self-government, and was renamed Tasmania to mark the fact and as a deliberate measure by free-settlers to distance its convict past. Sir Henry was the first Tasmanian Governor to occupy Government House, Hobart, the beautiful neo-gothic Vice-Regal residence on the banks of the River Derwent.

At this time the constitution act was awaiting the royal assent, and the legislative council might wisely have postponed meeting until news of this had been received. It, however, met in July and one of its acts was to form a committee to inquire into the working of the convict department. Dr Hampton, the comptroller-general of convicts, was summoned to appear as a witness and refused to attend. The council decided he was guilty of contempt and arrested him. Hampton served a writ of habeas corpus upon the sergeant-at-arms and the opinion of the law officers of the crown was against the legality of the council's proceedings. Young then attended at the house and prorogued the council until 20 October. The Times severely commented upon Young's conduct, but he was commended by the British government. The Tasmanian supreme court ruled against the council, and when it was taken to the privy council this decision was confirmed. The new constitution was soon successfully instituted and Young welcomed the change in his position, feeling that he was now above the battle and freed from much trying responsibility. He travelled through the island, showed much interest in its development, and capably carried out the work of his office.

Later life
Young left Tasmania on 10 December 1861 for Melbourne, whence he travelled to England and lived in retirement in London until his death there on 18 September 1870. He is buried in Brompton Cemetery, London.

Youngtown, Tasmania, was named in honour of Young.

Family
Young married Augusta Sophia Marryat (born 1829) in 1848. She was the daughter of a former slaveholder, Charles Marryat, of Potter's Bar, Middlesex, who had been compensated part of £34,000 in the 1830s upon the emancipation of slavery.  Augusta (later Lady Young) was the niece of the novelist Captain Frederick Marryat, and sister of Charles Marryat, Dean of Adelaide (1887–1906). Her mother was Caroline Short, whose brother, Augustus Short, was the first Anglican bishop of Adelaide.

The couple had four children, two boys and two girls.

The town of Port Augusta in South Australia is named after Augusta, as is the tiny suburb of Marryatville in Adelaide's eastern suburbs.

Augusta outlived her husband by 43 years, dying in Christchurch, Hampshire in 1913.

References

1803 births
1870 deaths
Governors of South Australia
Governors of the Colony of South Australia
Governors of Tasmania
Knights Commander of the Order of St Michael and St George
People from Brabourne
Burials at Brompton Cemetery
Van Diemen's Land people
Colony of Tasmania people
19th-century Australian public servants
British colonial governors and administrators in Oceania